The 2022 Annual King's Cup Football Tournament, commonly referred to as 2022 King's Cup, is the 48th King's Cup, the annual international men's football tournament organised by Football Association of Thailand. It is being held in Chiang Mai, Thailand, from 22 to 25 September 2022. Two matches were held on 22 September, the winners of which qualified for the final. The two other teams played the play-off for the 3rd spot.

As hosts, Thailand participated automatically in the tournament; they were joined by the CONCACAF team Trinidad and Tobago and AFC teams Tajikistan and Malaysia. In the final on 25 September, Tajikistan emerged victorious and clinched their first title, defeating Malaysia in penalty shootout.

Defending champions Curaçao did not participate.

Participating teams 
The following teams have participated in the tournament:

 1 FIFA Ranking as of 21 September 2022.

Venue 
All matches are held at the 700th Anniversary Stadium in Chiang Mai, Thailand.

Matches 
All times are local, Indochina Time (UTC+7)

Match rules 
 90 minutes.
 Penalty shoot-out after a draw in 90 minutes.
 Maximum of five substitutions.

Bracket

Semi-finals

Third place play-off

Final

Winners

References

External links 
 Football Association of Thailand – FAT official site 

King's Cup
King's Cup
King's Cup
King's Cup
Sports competitions in Bangkok